Coley Glacier is a glacier,  long, on the east side of James Ross Island. It flows into Erebus and Terror Gulf just north of Cape Gage. It was surveyed by the Falkland Islands Dependencies Survey (FIDS) in 1945 and 1953, and named by the UK Antarctic Place-Names Committee for John A. Coley of FIDS, meteorological assistant at Hope Bay in 1952 and 1953.

See also
 List of glaciers in the Antarctic
 Glaciology

References 

Glaciers of James Ross Island